Cecilia Dujić (born 6 December 1987) is a retired Croatian female volleyball player. She was part of the Croatia women's national volleyball team.

She competed at the 2009 Women's European Volleyball Championship, and at the 2010 FIVB Volleyball Women's World Championship in Japan. She played with ŽOK Split 1700.

Clubs
  ŽOK Split 1700 (2009-2010)

References

External links
 

1987 births
Living people
Croatian women's volleyball players
Place of birth missing (living people)
Opposite hitters
Outside hitters
Mediterranean Games medalists in volleyball
Mediterranean Games bronze medalists for Croatia
Competitors at the 2009 Mediterranean Games